Kottayil Kovilakam  or Kottayil Kovilakom is a small village in the Paravur taluk, Ernakulam district of Kerala state, near Kochi, south India.

It has a temple devoted to Krishna located on the top of a hill.

Kottayil Kovilakam - on the banks of the confluence of three rivers is a small hill on top of which there is a Krishna Temple, a Syrian Church, a Mosque and a Jewish Synagogue depicting the cultural harmony of Kerala.
All the above lie in 1 km circumference.
Kottayil Kovilakam at Chendamangalam, which was the seat of Kshatriya chieftains of Villarvattom is situated near the ancient Kunnathuthali temple. Chendamangalam is an important center of hand loom weaving and coir manufacturing. Near the Krishna temple on one side tipu sultans cave and on either side Arabs cemetery. On the riverside a group of huge rocks known as 'ANAPARA' is the main highlight. The kunnathuthali temples were constructed 400 years ago.

References

Villages in Ernakulam district